Unmistakably Lou is an album by American R&B singer Lou Rawls, released in 1977 on the Philadelphia International Records label.  It was Rawls' second PIR album and performed respectably ( 14 R&B and No. 41 pop), although its sales fell well short of his 1976 PIR debut All Things in Time.  Only one single, "See You When I Git There", was released from the album in the US; alongside "You'll Never Find Another Love Like Mine" and "Lady Love", it remains one of Rawls' best-known PIR songs.  Like its predecessor, Unmistakably Lou is a well-regarded album for its mix of high-quality Philadelphia soul songs and other more jazz-influenced tracks (atypical and distinctive for a PIR production). Rawls won the Grammy Award for Best Male R&B Vocal Performance for the album in 1978.

In 2005, Unmistakably Lou was reissued by Demon Music in the UK in a double package with All Things in Time.

Track listing 
All tracks written by Kenny Gamble and Leon Huff unless stated
  "See You When I Git There" – 4:43
  "Spring Again" – 4:29
  "Early Morning Love" – 5:44
  "Some Folks Never Learn" – 3:32
  "Someday You'll Be Old" – 3:43
  "Secret Tears" (Jack Faith, Phillip Terry) – 4:08
  "We Understand Each Other" – 4:19
  "It's Our Anniversary Today" (Dexter Wansel) – 3:42
  "All the Way" (Jimmy Van Heusen, Sammy Cahn) – 2:44

Singles 
 "See You When I Git There" (US Pop No. 66, US R&B No. 8)
 "Some Folks Never Learn" (UK/Europe only, not released as a single in the US)

References

External links
 

1977 albums
Lou Rawls albums
Albums produced by Kenneth Gamble
Albums produced by Leon Huff
Albums produced by Bobby Martin
Albums arranged by Bobby Martin
Albums recorded at Sigma Sound Studios
Philadelphia International Records albums